Long Hollow is an unincorporated community and census-designated place in Roberts County, South Dakota, United States. Its population was 265 as of the 2020 census.

Geography

Demographics

References

Unincorporated communities in Roberts County, South Dakota
Unincorporated communities in South Dakota
Census-designated places in Roberts County, South Dakota
Census-designated places in South Dakota